Sararud or Sara Rud or Sera Rud, also rendered as Sararu, may refer to:
 Sara Rud, Gilan
 Sararud-e Olya, Kermanshah Province
 Sararud-e Sofla, Kermanshah Province
 Sararud, Markazi